Robert Henle may refer to:

 Robert A. Henle (1924–1989), electrical engineer
 Robert J. Henle (1909–2001), President of Georgetown University